The Windrose 26 is an American sailboat that was designed by W. Shad Turner as a cruiser and first built in 1982.

Production
The design was built by Laguna Yachts in the United States, starting in 1982, but it is now out of production.

The Windrose 26 is a related design to the Laguna 26 which was produced by the company at the same time. Both designs led to the Classic 26, which was produced by Classic Yachts starting in 1991, using the Laguna molds, after Laguna Yachts went out of business.

Design
The Windrose 26 is a recreational keelboat, built predominantly of fiberglass, with wood trim. It has a masthead sloop rig, a raked stem, a plumb transom, a transom-hung rudder controlled by a tiller and a fixed fin keel. It displaces  and carries  of ballast.

For sailing downwind the design may be equipped with a symmetrical spinnaker.

See also
List of sailing boat types

References

External links
Photo of a Windrose 26

Keelboats
1980s sailboat type designs
Sailing yachts 
Sailboat type designs by W. Shad Turner
Sailboat types built by Laguna Yachts